Charles Patrick Eidson Jr. (born October 10, 1980) is an American former professional basketball player. He is 2.03 m (6 ft 8 in) tall and he played mainly at the small forward position. He could also play at both the point guard and shooting guard positions, as well as a point forward.

High school
Eidson played high school basketball at Pinewood Preparatory School, where he was a Parade All-American and South Carolina Gatorade Player of the Year. He also played at the Albert Schweitzer Tournament in 1998, and at the Nike Hoop Summit in 1999.

College career
Eidson played college basketball at the University of South Carolina, with the Gamecocks men's basketball team.

Professional career
After his college career with the University of South Carolina Gamecocks, Eidson spent a season with the North Charleston Lowgators of the NBDL. After a short stint with the Boston Celtics, he signed a one-year deal with the Gießen 46ers in the German Basketball Bundesliga. The team, that was on the verge of relegation the season before, was brought back to life by Eidson, who led the 46ers to the Bundesliga playoffs against RheinEnergie Köln. In the decisive game five, Eidson scored 40 points, leading Gießen to a 3–2 series win and straight to the semifinals, where they lost against the eventual champion GHP Bamberg. For his stellar performance, the Small Forward was named the 2004–05 Bundesliga Best Offensive Player. In a pre-season game versus EnBW Ludwigsburg the following fall, Eidson suffered a torn ACL and sat out 172 days before returning to the starting lineup of the 46ers in a Bundesliga game against BG Karlsruhe. Only three games later, Eidson torched TBB Trier for 41 points. After the season, Eidson left Germany and signed with Strasbourg IG in the French Pro A, where he also gained EuroCup experience. One year later, he signed with the Lithuanian powerhouse Lietuvos rytas of Vilnius.

When Eidson came to Lietuvos rytas, he quickly became a starter, and one of the team's leaders. His most memorable performance was in the EuroLeague game against Maccabi Tel Aviv, when he scored 28 points and helped Rytas to win. FC Barcelona Bàsquet attempted to buy his contract out, but he remained with Lietuvos Rytas.

In 2008–09 season, he won the EuroCup with the team also earning the EuroCup MVP award, averaging 15.9 points and 21.3 ranking per game. He also led the team winning the Baltic League that season, scoring a career high 41 point in the final against BC Žalgiris, earning him the Baltic League Finals MVP award.

In 2009, he moved to the Israeli League club Maccabi Tel Aviv, signing a two-year contract, estimated 1.5M$ net income for the whole period. In his second season with Maccabi, Eidson led the team to the EuroLeague Final with a great performance in the semifinal against Real Madrid: 19 point with 66% from the field, 8 rebounds, and 6 steals, ultimately getting 33 Ranking. In the finals Maccabi lost to Panathinaikos.

In 2011, he left Maccabi Tel Aviv and signed a lucrative contract with FC Barcelona. In Barcelona, Eidson was released due to cutting of the budget.

His next station was the Russian League club UNICS, where he signed a two-year contract. He failed to qualify with the team to the 2012–13 Euroleague, ending up instead in the 2012–13 EuroCup season. He was named to the All-Eurocup Second Team in 2013.

Personal life
 He is married to his college sweetheart Samantha. A fellow Gamecock alum, Sam played middle blocker for the Kim Hudson-coached women's volleyball team throughout her college career.  His twin children are named Charles III (Tripp) and Maddie.
 Fellow 2008–09 EuroCup teammate Marijonas Petravičius was a teammate of his at South Carolina;  their future wives were both on the women's volleyball team there.
 When asked if he missed America and his family, he responded: "Of course. I love when I go home and get to see my family and get a break, but that is how everyone feels when they go on vacation.  I consider myself as living in Europe.  I am always excited and ready to come back."
 The fifth game of the quarterfinals series between Gießen vs Köln in 2005, where Eidson scored 40 points, was later portrayed in a documentary movie called "FÜNF (5)" (FIVE).

Career statistics

EuroLeague

|-
| style="text-align:left;"| 2007–08
| style="text-align:left;"| Lietuvos Rytas
| 18 || 15 || 29.1 || .408 || .489 || .778 || 4.1 || 2.7 || 2.2 || .2 || 12.2 || 12.7
|-
| style="text-align:left;"| 2009–10
| style="text-align:left;"| Maccabi
| 20 || 19 || 32.3 || .442 || .329 || .791 || 4.5 || 2.6 || 1.2 || .2 || 12.0 || 13.4
|-
| style="text-align:left;"| 2010–11
| style="text-align:left;"| Maccabi
| 22 || 20 || 29.1 || .479 || .339 || .705 || 4.3 || 3.5 || style="background:#CFECEC;"| 2.6 || .1 || 9.7 || 14.3
|-
| style="text-align:left;"| 2011–12
| style="text-align:left;"| Barcelona
| 18 || 14 || 20.4 || .435 || .365 || .786 || 3.4 || 2.3 || 1.2 || .1 || 7.7 || 9.2
|- class="sortbottom"
| style="text-align:left;"| Career
| style="text-align:left;"|
| 78 || 68 || 27.9 || .441 || .373 || .765 || 4.1 || 2.8 || 1.8 || .2 || 10.4 || 12.5

References

External links

 ACB Profile 
 
 Euroleague Profile 
 College Bio

1980 births
Living people
American expatriate basketball people in France
American expatriate basketball people in Germany
American expatriate basketball people in Israel
American expatriate basketball people in Lithuania
American expatriate basketball people in Russia
American expatriate basketball people in Spain
American men's basketball players
Basketball players from South Carolina
BC Rytas players
BC UNICS players
Charleston Lowgators players
FC Barcelona Bàsquet players
Giessen 46ers players
Liga ACB players
Maccabi Tel Aviv B.C. players
Parade High School All-Americans (boys' basketball)
People from Summerville, South Carolina
Point guards
Shooting guards
SIG Basket players
Small forwards
South Carolina Gamecocks men's basketball players